Shahpur is a town and a nagar panchayat in Burhanpur district in the Indian state of Madhya Pradesh.
 
The Shahpur Nagar Panchayat has population of 19,719 of which 10,174 are males while 9,545 are females as per report released by Census India 2011.

From 1957 till 2003 had a separate MLA seat, now merged it is with Burhanpur. It is located at Icchapur–Indore State Highway, connected with major villages of the area.

Shahapur was the Deshmukhi seat of administration during Maratha Empire and British rule. At present the president of shahpur is Mrs. Shobha Rambhau Lande.

It is the first Nagar Panchayat of its kind in the state with all wards having names of historical leaders and Sant-Mahatmas. It has total 15 wards having names of Sant-Mahatmas, Historical-Political Leader and Social Workers.

Shahpur town is one of the main centers of banana farming in the Burhanpur district. Around 50 small villages are connected to Shahpur town, hence it is in demand for separate Tehsil.

Most of the population of the town are Marathi following all Marathi traditions and festivals such as – Pola, Gudipadwa, Dashehra and Deewali, etc. Shahpur is famous for Buffalo fight organizing every year on the next day of Deewali.

Geography
It has an average elevation of 238 metres (780 feet).

Transport 
The nearest airport is indore.

Demographics
The Shahpur Nagar Panchayat has population of 19,719 of which 10,174 are males while 9,545 are females as per report released by Census India 2011.

Population of Children with age of 0-6 is 2675 which is 13.57% of total population of Shahpur (NP). In Shahpur Nagar Panchayat, Female Sex Ratio is of 938 against state average of 931. Moreover Child Sex Ratio in Shahpur is around 841 compared to Madhya Pradesh state average of 918. Literacy rate of Shahpur city is 70.21% higher than state average of 69.32%. In Shahpur, Male literacy is around 77.87% while female literacy rate is 62.19%.

Shahpur Nagar Panchayat has total administration over 4,062 houses to which it supplies basic amenities like water and sewerage. It is also authorize to build roads within Nagar Panchayat limits and impose taxes on properties coming under its jurisdiction.

Educational Institution
Prominent educational institutions include-

1. Shahpur Pvt. Industrial Training Institute (ITI)

2. Gyandeep hr. Sec. School Shahpur

3. Swami Vivekanand College Shahpur

Notable people

Indrasen Deshmukh, Progressive Agricultarist and politician

References

Cities and towns in Burhanpur district
Burhanpur